Bangnim-myeon is a myeon (township) in Pyeongchang county of Gangwon-do South Korea. The myeon is located in northern central part of the county. The total area of Bangnim-myeon is 120.85 square kilometers, and, as of 2008, the population was 2,453 people.

References 

Pyeongchang County
Towns and townships in Gangwon Province, South Korea